The University of Washington School of Public Health is the only public health school located in the Northwest, and is based on the main campus of the University of Washington in Seattle, Washington. The School is accredited through the Council on Education for Public Health (CEPH). It ranks among the United States' best schools for public health. U.S. News & World Report ranked the school sixth among all public health schools in its last survey of this discipline (2014).

History
The school was founded on July 1, 1970, with four departments: Biostatistics, Environmental Health, Epidemiology, and Health Systems & Population Health (formerly Health Services).

The Department of Global Health is the newest department and was established jointly with the School of Medicine in late 2006. The Bill & Melinda Gates Foundation, also located in Seattle, partnered with the University of Washington to establish the department.

The Department of Environmental Health changed its name to the Department of Environmental & Occupational Health Sciences in 2003.

The Online MPH Program is a partial distance learning public health program in the Department of Health Systems and Population Health. This program is designed for working professionals that began in 1980 with money from a Bureau of Health Professions Special Project Grant. It has options for a Master in Public Health (MPH) degree, a Graduate Certificate in Public Health, or single courses. It was called the Extended MPH Degree Program and later the Executive MPH (MPH) until being renamed the Online MPH Program in 2020.

Academics
The School of Public Health has five departments: Biostatistics;Environmental and Occupational Health Sciences; Epidemiology; Health Systems and Population Health (formerly Health Services); and Global Health. In addition, there are interdisciplinary programs in maternal and child health, nutritional sciences, and public health genetics.

The School of Public Health confers the following graduate degrees: MPH (Master of Public Health), MS,  MHIHIM (Master of Health Informatics and Health Information Management), MHA (Master of Health Administration),  and PhD.  For undergraduate students, the School offers a major  in Public Health (BA or BS),  the Department of Environmental & Occupational Health Sciences offers a major in Environmental Health (BS), and the Department of Health Systems and Population Health offers a BS in Health Informatics and Health Information Management.

References

External links
UW School of Public Health Website

Colleges, schools, and departments of the University of Washington
Schools of public health in the United States
Educational institutions established in 1970
Medical and health organizations based in Washington (state)
1970 establishments in Washington (state)